Arun Singh (born 29 August 1944) is a former union minister of state for defence in the Government of India. He was minister in the government headed by Rajiv Gandhi.

Born a Rajkumar in the princely family of Kapurthala, Singh was born in Srinagar, in what was then the salute state of Jammu and Kashmir. He is the elder son of Maharajkumar Karamjit Singh (1896-1967), the second son of  Maharaja Jagatjit Singh of Kapurthala. Educated at the Doon School and at St. Stephen's College, Delhi, Singh subsequently read for an MA at St Catharine's College, Cambridge. At Cambridge, he was a classmate of Rajiv Gandhi. After completing his MA in 1971, Arun Singh joined The Metal Box Company and later Reckitt and Coleman. In 1984, he was elected as an MP from Uttar Pradesh, serving in the Rajya Sabha until 1988.

Singh drew some negative attention for leaving the government before the arrival of the Bofors scandal.  Singh left the government without explanation. Singh maintained that he had not received any money from the company.

At the time of Kargil war, NDA defence minister Jaswant Singh brought him back as his advisor.

According to Hindustan Times  quoting an article published in Caravan's May 2014 Issue, Rajiv Gandhi, along with Arun Singh and Arun Nehru, was responsible for taking decision on " go ahead" for Operation Blue Star despite Indira Gandhi's consistence reluctance against Army entering the sacred shrine . The decision was taken with an eye on the Lok Sabha polls slatted to be held at the end of 1984.

References

https://web.archive.org/web/20140529103448/http://www.hindustantimes.com/punjab/chandigarh/eye-on-lok-sabha-polls-rajiv-led-trio-convinced-indira-says-report/article1-1223540.aspx

1944 births
Living people
The Doon School alumni
St. Stephen's College, Delhi alumni
Alumni of St Catharine's College, Cambridge
People from Kapurthala
Punjabi people
St. Xavier's Patna alumni
Politicians from Patna
20th-century Indian politicians